The Myanmar Police Force, formerly the People's Police Force, is the law enforcement agency of Myanmar. It was established in 1964 as an independent department under the Ministry of Home Affairs.

History 
The Police Force in Myanmar have an extensive history; the police force also includes local police and regional police in different jurisdictions.

British rule in Myanmar
The Indian Imperial Police was the primary law enforcement in Burma until 1937, when it was split from British India.

In 1872 the third mayor of Mergui District, Sir Ashly Din (1870–1875) assigned the first police officer to be stationed at Maliwan, a village 24 miles north of current Victoria Point.

Perhaps the most famous policeman in Burma from this period is the author George Orwell, who in 1922 joined the Indian Imperial Police in Burma.

Post-independence (1948–present)

On 16 March 1988 following the killing of two students during the pro-democracy demonstrations, students marching on Prome Road were confronted near Inya Lake by the  security force riot police and many beaten to death or drowned.

The national police are made up of several smaller entities, including
 Myanmar Railways Police
 Intelligence division

Organisation
The current director general of Myanmar Police Force is Major General Zin Min Htet with its headquarters in Naypyidaw. Its command structure is based on established civil jurisdictions. Under the command of police headquarters, state and region police forces have been established in respective territories of states and divisions with headquarters in their capital cities.

State and division police forces
There are 14 state and divisional police forces and three additional state/division police forces commanded by police brigadiers or colonels.
Their jurisdictions are divided according to the Civil Administration. The states and divisions, additional states have the same status.

Each state and divisional police force consist of four components.
 Office of the Commander of the State and Divisional Police Force
 Office of the Commander of the District Police Force
 Office of the Commander of the Township Police Force
 Police Stations

In previous time, the district police forces are classified into two classes depending on the area, population and development, namely A and B Class. Commanders of the A Class District Police Forces are police lieutenant colonels, and B Classes are police majors, but there is no classification and all districts assigned with lieutenant colonel. Commanders of township police forces are police majors, and police station officers are police captains.

Special Departments
There are four Special Departments, in which the first ten departments are headed by the police brigadier generals and the remaining two are by police colonels.
 Security Police Force 
 Border Guard Police Force
 Special Intelligence Department (Special Branch)
 Criminal Investigation Department (CID)
 Railways Police Department
 Anti-human Trafficking Police Force
 Maritime Police force
 Aviation Police Force
 Drug Enforcement Division
 Financial Investigation force
 Myanmar Traffic Police
 Tourist Security Police Force
 Oil Field Security Police Force
 Forestry Security Police Force
 Highway Police Force 
 Municipal Police Department

Training Centres

There are three main Training Centers, one Central Training Institute of Myanmar Police Force and Three Police Training Depots. The State and Divisional Police Forces have their own training centres for refresher courses and Junior Leader (NCO) Courses.

Bachelor's degree holders from Distance Learning University were disqualified from sitting the SIP exam. Thus vast numbers of Bachelor holding police personal were concerned for their future.

No. 1 Police Training Depot
The No.1 Police Training Depot is commanded by a Police Lieutenant Colonel and undertakes:

No. 2 Police Training Depot 

The No.2 Police Training Depot is also commanded by a Police Lieutenant Colonel, and undertakes only Basic Training Course for Constables, which normally takes around 6 months to complete.

Taung Lay Lone Police Training Depot
The Taung Lay Lone Police Training Depot is commanded by a Police Lieutenant Colonel and undertakes:

Combat Police Battalions (SWAT) 
There are sixteen Police Battalions to carry out general security duties under the command of Battalion Control Command. The Battalion Commandants are Police Lieutenant Colonels. As the populace of the cities including Yangon and Mandalay have been increased day after day, problems on social, economy and politics are risen up that could lead to emergence of civil unrest and sabotage. It is necessary to prevent from destruction and harassment, VIP and project factories and workshops, security of diplomats and their embassies. Seven of these Police Battalions are situated in the Yangon Divisional areas and two in Mandalay and three in Arakan, one in Sagaing, one in Mon State, one in Pegu, one in Prome.

These specially-trained and combat capable battalions are formed with personnel from former Riot Security Police, better known as "Lon Htein" Units. Each battalion consists of 500+ personnel and these battalions are supported by two support battalions, which include signal and medical units. These battalions structure are similar to that of Army's Light Infantry Battalions and they are subordinate to their respective Regional Military Commands.
 1st Combat Police Battalion (HQ at Hlawga)
 2nd Combat Police Battalion (HQ at Maungtaw)
 3rd Combat Police Battalion (HQ at Shwemyayar)
 4th Combat Police Battalion (HQ at Shwesaryan)
 5th Combat Police Battalion (HQ at Hmawbi)
 6th Combat Police Battalion (HQ at Shwepyitha)
 7th Combat Police Battalion (HQ at Kyauktan)
 8th Combat Police Battalion (HQ at Mingaladon)
 9th Combat Police Battalion (HQ at Hlaingthaya)
 10th Combat Police Battalion
 11th Combat Police Battalion
 12th Combat Police Battalion
 14th Combat Police Battalion (HQ at Pa Lake, Mandalay)
 15th Combat Police Battalion
 16th Combat Police Battalion

Anti-Narcotic Task Forces 

26 special anti-narcotic task forces have been established under the direction of the Central Committee for Drug Abuse Control.

Weapons and equipment 

Myanmar Police Force uses wide range of weapons and ammunitions, ranging from Second World War vintage to modern sophisticated weapons. Most of the weapons are either seized from ethnic wars and narco-insurgents or locally produced copies of the G3 and other weapons phased out of their army.

Pistols 
 Enfield revolver
 Colt Detective Special
 Ka Pa Sa MA5 MKI
 Ka Pa Sa MA5 MKII

Sub machine gun 
 Heckler & Koch MP5 (Norinco made NR-08)
 Ka Pa Sa BA-52
 Sten Gun
 BA93
 BA94
 MA13 MKI
 MA13 MKII

Rifles 
 M1 carbine
 Type-56 Carbine
 Type 63 assault rifle
 M1 Garand
 Lee–Enfield Rifles
 AK-47 series（Including Chinese Type 56）
 M16 rifle
 M4 carbine
 Norinco CQ
 Norinco QBZ 97
 Ka Pa Sa BA63
 Ka Pa Sa MA11
 Ka Pa Sa MA3

Machine gun 

 Bren Gun
 Ka Pa Sa BA64
 Ka Pa Sa MA12
 Type 81 lmg (seized from narco ethnic insurgents)
 Type 56 lmg (seized from narco ethnic insurgents)

Sniper rifle 

 M40 rifle (seized from ethnic and narcotic insurgents)
 Ka Pa Sa BA100
 Ka Pa Sa MAS MKII

Non-Lethal Weapons 

 Taser
 Pepper Spray cans
 Pepper-spray projectile gun
 Pepperball
 Rubber, beanbag, & plastic bullet
 Baton
 Riot shield
 M84 stun grenade
 Tear gas
 M6/M7 series chemical grenade
 Sting grenade

Automobiles

Cars and Trucks

 Japan cars (confiscated item),
 Chevrolet Suburban (confiscated item),
 Range Rover donated by Foreign Organisations for Anti-drugs Enforcement,
 Mercedes Benz C-Class sedan (confiscated item),
 Toyota Dyna paddy wagon (Private owned vehicles are commonly called as volunteers patrol cars),
 Toyota closed double cab (confiscated item, used by escort team, patrol),
 Mitsubishi double cab (confiscated item, used by Police Col, Yangon),
 Mitsubishi pickup (confiscated item, used by Township Police Station, Yangon),
 Mitsubishi pickup (confiscated item, used by Police Lt Col, Yangon),
 Toyota pickup (confiscated item, used by Township Police Station, Yangon),
 FAW pickup,
 Honda Saloon, Patrol car,
 Jeep, Used by police station,
 Mazda B pick-up, Used by police station,
 Toyota Celica, used as a police lead vehicle and as a high-speed police car to arrest sport cars,
 Nissan Fairlady Z, used as a police lead vehicle and as a high-speed police car to arrest sport cars.

Armoured vehicles

Coastal Patrol Craft

River Patrol Boat

Rank structure and insignia

Commissioned officers

Enlisted ranks

See also

 Aung San
 Rangoon bombing
 Human rights in Burma
 Crime in Burma

References

Citations

Sources

Books

Journal articles

 
 

Law of Myanmar
Law enforcement in Myanmar
Military of Myanmar
1964 establishments in Burma